Baburia is a genus of moths belonging to family Tortricidae.

Species
Baburia abdita (Diakonoff, 1973)
Baburia paucustriga (Jirasuttayaporn and Pinkaew, 2018) 
Baburia trachymelas (Diakonoff, 1973)

See also
List of Tortricidae genera

References

External links
tortricidae.com

Tortricidae genera
Olethreutinae